Johan Mounard (born 14 June 1979) is a French gymnast. He competed at the 2004 Summer Olympics.

References

External links
 

1979 births
Living people
French male artistic gymnasts
Olympic gymnasts of France
Gymnasts at the 2004 Summer Olympics
Sportspeople from Lyon